Four ships of the Royal Navy have been named HMS Turquoise.

 , a naval trawler, damaged on 31 August 1942 after colliding with the destroyer  which lost control after an attack by German aircraft

See also
 HMT Kingston Turquoise

Royal Navy ship names